Lugman Ismail Ali is a Somali politician. He was the Minister of Labour and Social Affairs of Somalia, having been appointed to the position on 17 January 2014 by Prime Minister Abdiweli Sheikh Ahmed. Lugman Ismail Ali succeeded Maryam Qaasim when her post as Minister for Human Development and Public Services ended on 17 January 2014. The Ministry was split to allow the creation of 6 cabinet positions one of which was the Ministry of Labour and Social Affairs. The other 5 cabinet positions are Ministry of Education, Ministry of Culture and Higher Education, Ministry of Health, Ministry of Women and Human Rights, Ministry of Sports and Youth. On 12 January 2015, Lugman Ismail Ali was succeeded by Mohamed Omar Eymoy.

References

Living people
Government ministers of Somalia
Year of birth missing (living people)
Place of birth missing (living people)